Mullet, mullets, The Mullet or The Mullets may refer to:

Fish 
 Mullet (fish), or "grey mullet", of the family Mugilidae
Flathead grey mullet, or striped mullet, Mugil cephalus, a food fish species in the family Mugilidae
 Goatfish, or "red mullet", of the family Mullidae; in particular, red mullet of the genus Mullus
 Malagasy mountain mullet, Acentrogobius therezieni, a species of fish in the family Gobiidae endemic to Madagascar
 Pearl mullet, Chalcalburnus tarichi, a species of ray-finned fish in the family Cyprinidae native to Turkey
 Shorthead redhorse, Moxostoma macrolepidotum, a freshwater fish of North America, also known as common mullet, mullet, redhorse mullet

Hairstyle 
 Mullet (haircut), a hairstyle that is short in the front, top, and sides, but long in the back

Media
 Mullet (film), a 2001 Australian film
 The Mullets, a UPN TV sitcom
Mullets (comic strip), a short-lived comic strip

Places 
 Mullet, Albania, a village in Tirana District, Albania
 Mullet Creek, a stream in the Falkland Islands
 Mullet Peninsula, aka "The Mullet", in the barony of Erris, County Mayo, Ireland
 Mullet River, a river in Wisconsin

Other 
 Land Mullet, Egernia major, one of the largest members of the skink family (Scincidae) native to Australia
 Mullet, a type of star in heraldry
 Mullet, a person born in Arundel, Sussex, England due to the presence of mullet fish in the local river
 Mullet Festival, annual event held in Niceville, Florida
 Norman Mullet, the chief superintendent in the British television show A Touch of Frost (TV series)

See also 
 American Mullet, a 2001 documentary film directed by Jennifer Arnold
 Mullet Key, a historic island near Crystal River, Florida
 Mullet Fever, the fifth album by Canadian grindcore band Fuck the Facts (2001)
 Mormons vs. Mullets, 2020 BYU vs. Coastal Carolina football game
 Mullett (disambiguation)
 Mulet